Acacia disparrima, also commonly known as southern salwood, is a shrub or tree belonging to the genus Acacia and the subgenus Juliflorae that is native to north eastern Australia.

Description
Like most species of Acacia it has phyllodes rather than true leaves. The phyllodes have many parallel longitudinal nerves with four to seven per millimetre. The glabrous and resinous seed pods are straight to moderately curved and usually twisted. The seeds inside are arranged transversely and have a creamy grey to grey funicle that is folded.

Taxonomy
The species was first formally described by the botanists W.M.McDonald and Bruce Maslin in 2000 as part of the work Taxonomic revision of the salwoods: Acacia aulacocarpa Cunn. ex Benth. and its allies (Leguminosae: Mimosoideae: section Juliflorae) as published in the journal Australian Systematic Botany. The species was reclassified as Racosperma disparrimum by Leslie Pedley in 2003 then returned to genus Acacia in 2006. Other synonyms include Acacia aulacocarpa var. macrocarpa and Acacia leucadendron.
It is closely related to Acacia aulacocarpa with which it is often confused.

Distribution
It is endemic to the coastal regions of Queensland and northern New South Wales extending into the adjacent tablelands of the east in northern Queensland. In New South Wales it occurs as far south as the Bellinger River where it is found along the edges of rainforest and behind coastal sand dunes as a part of wet sclerophyll forest and sclerophyll woodland communities.

See also
List of Acacia species

References

disparrima
Flora of Queensland
Flora of New South Wales
Taxa named by Bruce Maslin
Plants described in 2000